The 43rd Division was created in February 1949 under the Regulation of the Redesignations of All Organizations and Units of the Army, issued by Central Military Commission on November 1, 1948, basing on the 25th Brigade, 9th Column of Zhongyuan Field Army. Its history could be traced to 1st Independent Brigade of Taihang Military District, formed in late 1946.

The division was a part of 15th Corps. Under the flag of 43rd Division it took part in the Chinese civil war.

In December 1950 the division was disbanded.

This division is not related to 43rd Airborne Division, now a mobile asset of 15th Airborne Corps.

References

中国人民解放军各步兵师沿革，http://blog.sina.com.cn/s/blog_a3f74a990101cp1q.html

Infantry divisions of the People's Liberation Army
Military units and formations established in 1949
Military units and formations disestablished in 1950